Vlahinja is a village in Serbia situated in the municipality of Kuršumlija, district of Toplica. In 2002, it had 88 inhabitants, of which 87 were Serbs (98,86%).

In 1948, the village had 494 inhabitants, in 1981 194, and in 1991, 121.

Notes and references

See also 
 List of cities, towns and villages in Serbia
 List of cities in Serbia

External links
  Satellite view of Vlahinja
  Vlahinja

Populated places in Toplica District